Peak is an Artificial Intelligence company headquartered in Manchester, UK. It was founded in 2015 and has additional offices in Jaipur, India, and New York City, United States. It is known for its Artificial Intelligence platform, a SaaS platform that allows data scientists to build AI workflows, invoke them on ingested data and expose the results via APIs and/or built-in web applications, as well as abstracting the underlying cloud infrastructure.

History 

The company was founded by CEO Richard Potter, David Leitch and Atul Sharma. In 2015, Peak was one of the winners of the Tech North Northern Stars competition. In 2017, it secured £2.5 million in Series A capital funding from MMC Ventures for investment in machine learning and artificial intelligence technologies and was named as one of the top five startups in Manchester by Wired magazine. In 2018, it was chosen to work as part of Arsenal F.C.'s Innovation Lab and it was one of the 37 fastest growing technology companies in the UK selected to join the Tech City UK Upscale programme.

In April 2020, the company raised $12 million in extended series A funding, required for sustaining its growth, commercial expansion, and R&D efforts. In February 2021, Peak announced a $21 million Series B funding round – led by investors Oxx, Praetura Ventures, MMC Ventures and Arete – to further make AI accessible to non-tech companies. In August 2021, Peak announced a $75 million Series C funding round, led by SoftBank Vision Fund 2.

References 

Companies based in Manchester
Data
AI companies
Privately held companies of England
British companies established in 2015
2015 establishments in England